The Tri-Valley School District is a public school district in Schuylkill County, Pennsylvania. It serves the municipalities of Eldred, Hegins, Hubley, Barry, and Upper Mahantongo Townships. The district features two elementary schools and one combined junior/senior high school.caca

School districts in Schuylkill County, Pennsylvania